Pashai (also Romanized as Pāshā’ī; also known as Pāshāhī and Pashey) is a village in Zavkuh Rural District, Pishkamar District, Kalaleh County, Golestan Province, Iran. At the 2006 census, its population was 233, in 41 families.

References 

Populated places in Kalaleh County